Michael Anthony (born 10 February 1930) is a Caribbean author and historian, who was named one of the "50 most influential people in Trinidad and Tobago".

Early life and education
Born in the county of Mayaro, Trinidad, on 10 February 1930, to Nathaniel Anthony and Eva Jones Lazarus, Michael Anthony was educated on the island at Mayaro Roman Catholic School and Junior Technical College in San Fernando. He subsequently took a job as a laundry worker in Pointe-à-Pierre for five years but had ambitions to become a journalist. Later on, poems of his were published by the Trinidad Guardian in 1954. Yet it was not enough for him to secure a new job locally and Anthony decided to further his career in the United Kingdom.

Career outside Trinidad
Anthony's voyage to the UK on board the Hildebrandt took place in December 1954. In England he held several jobs, including as a sub-editor at Reuters news agency (1964–1968), while developing his career as a writer, writing short stories for the BBC radio programme Caribbean Voices.

In 1958 he married Yvette Phillips and they had four children — Jennifer, Keith, Carlos and Sandra Anthony.

Four years later, Anthony published his first book, The Games Were Coming, a cycling story inspired by real events. He followed up its success with The Year in San Fernando and Green Days by the River. He eventually returned to Trinidad in 1970, after spending two years as part of the Trinidadian diplomatic corps in Brazil, where his novel King of the Masquerade is set, and he worked variously as an editor, a researcher for the Ministry of Culture, and as a radio broadcaster of historical programmes. In 1992, he spent time at the University of Richmond in Virginia, teaching creative writing.

In his five-decade career, Anthony has had over 30 titles published, including novels, collections of short fiction, books for younger readers, travelogues and histories. He has also been a contributor to many anthologies and journals, including Caribbean Prose, Island Voices, Stories from the Caribbean, Response, The Sun's Eyes, West Indian Narrative, The Bajan, and BIM magazine.

Awards and honours
In 1979 Michael Anthony was awarded the Hummingbird Medal (Gold) for his contributions to Literature, and he received an honorary doctorate from the University of the West Indies (UWI) in 2003.

Bibliography 

 The Games Were Coming (1963)
 The Year in San Fernando (1965; revised edition 1970)
 Green Days by the River (1967)
 Tales for Young and Old (1967)
 Sandra Street and Other Stories (1973)
 Cricket in the Road (1973)
 King of the Masquerade (1974)
 Glimpses of Trinidad and Tobago (1974)
 Profile Trinidad (1974)
 Streets of Conflict (1976)
 Folk Tales and Fantasies (1976)
 The Making of Port of Spain (1978)
 All That Glitters (1981) (cited by the author as his favourite)
 Bright Road to El Dorado (1983)
 A Better and Brighter Day (1988)
 The Golden Quest: The Four Voyages of Christopher Columbus (1992)
 The Chieftain's Carnival and Other Stories (1993)
 In the Heat of the Day (1996)
 Historical Dictionary of Trinidad and Tobago (1997)
 High Tide of Intrigue (2001)
 Towns and Villages of Trinidad and Tobago (2001)
 The Sound of Marching Feet (2020)

Further reading 

 Kenneth Ramchand, "Novels of Childhood", in The West Indian Novel and Its Background. London: Faber & Faber, and New York: Barnes & Noble, 1970.
 James Brockway, Books and Bookmen, February 1974.
 World Literature Today, Spring 1997, p. 445.
 Americas, November/December 1997, p. 63.

References

External links 
Raymond Ramcharitar, "Michael Anthony cultivates a subtler kind of fiction", IslandMix, 11-05-2003
"Michael Anthony", Encyclopædia Britannica
Jeremy Poynting, "Michael Anthony", Contemporary Novelists, 2001. Encyclopedia.com
Carol Brennan, "Michael Anthony", Contemporary Black Biography.
 Shamshu Deen, "Michael Anthony: A Giant Among Us", Trinbagopan.com
 "Michael Anthony: Author and Historian", NALIS, Trinidad and Tobago.
 The literary papers of Michael Anthony can be found across repositories in Trinidad and Tobago and in the United States. Part of Anthony's archival collection, the Michael Anthony Papers is held at The Alma Jordan Library, Special Collections, University of the West Indies, St Augustine, Port of Spain. The Michael Anthony Papers, 1957-1984  are held at the Schomburg Center for Research in Black Culture, The New York Public Library.

1930 births
20th-century novelists
20th-century Trinidad and Tobago historians
Foundrymen
Living people
Trinidad and Tobago novelists
International Writing Program alumni
People from Mayaro–Rio Claro
Trinidad and Tobago male writers
Male novelists
Male journalists
Recipients of the Hummingbird Medal
20th-century male writers